Matthew Mullins (born July 28, 1994) is a Canadian rugby union player, in the sevens discipline.

Career
Mullins won gold as part of Canada's team at the 2015 Pan American Games in Toronto.

Mullins was part of Canada's 2018 Commonwealth Games, with the team getting knocked out in the group stage.

In June 2021, Mullins was named to Canada's 2020 Olympic team.

References

1994 births
Living people
Rugby sevens players at the 2018 Commonwealth Games
Commonwealth Games rugby sevens players of Canada
Canada international rugby sevens players
Rugby sevens players at the 2015 Pan American Games
Pan American Games gold medalists for Canada
Medalists at the 2015 Pan American Games
Pan American Games medalists in rugby sevens
Sportspeople from Belleville, Ontario
Rugby sevens players at the 2020 Summer Olympics
Olympic rugby sevens players of Canada